Leary is a city in Bowie County, Texas, United States. As part of the Texarkana metropolitan area, it had a 2020 census population of 433, down from 495 in 2010.

Geography

Leary is located in eastern Bowie County at  (33.469318, –94.221100). It is bordered on the south by U.S. Route 82 and the Red River Army Depot. Interstate 30 passes along the northern edge of the city, with access from exits 212 and 213.

Demographics

According to the 2000 U.S. census, there were 555 people, 223 households, and 177 families residing in the city. The racial makeup of the city was 92.07% White, 5.77% African American, 0.54% Native American, 0.36% Asian, 0.36% from other races, and 0.90% from two or more races. Hispanic or Latino of any race were 1.08% of the population.

There were 223 households, out of which 27.4% had children under the age of 18 living with them, 62.3% were married couples living together, 11.7% had a female householder with no husband present, and 20.6% were non-families. 19.7% of all households were made up of individuals, and 9.0% had someone living alone who was 65 years of age or older. The average household size was 2.49 and the average family size was 2.82.

In the city, the population was spread out, with 20.5% under the age of 18, 7.2% from 18 to 24, 24.9% from 25 to 44, 31.0% from 45 to 64, and 16.4% who were 65 years of age or older. The median age was 44 years. For every 100 females, there were 92.7 males. For every 100 females age 18 and over, there were 90.9 males.

The median income for a household in the city was $33,295, and the median income for a family was $36,071. Males had a median income of $29,196 versus $16,250 for females. The per capita income for the city was $14,898. About 9.8% of families and 11.2% of the population were below the poverty line, including 18.3% of those under age 18 and 7.2% of those age 65 or over.

Education
Most of Leary is served by the Leary Independent School District. Small portions of Leary are within the Red Lick Independent School District and Redwater Independent School District.

References

Cities in Bowie County, Texas
Cities in Texas
Cities in Texarkana metropolitan area